Bowling Green High School (BGHS) is a public high school in Bowling Green, Ohio, United States.  It is the only high school in the Bowling Green Area School District.  It serves the greater Bowling Green community, which includes the city and surrounding areas. As of 2021, the enrollment is 877.

Academics

Honors Program
BGHS offers an ever-increasing honors curriculum designed to prepare those students aiming to continue their education in college. Offerings include courses in English, biology, chemistry, world history, geopolitics, and more.
Recently, Bowling Green has added college-credit classes (CCP) that can be taken through University of Toledo and Bowling Green State University with dual enrollment.  In addition, students have the option of enrolling in courses at nearby Bowling Green State University through the Post Secondary Enrollment Options program.

Fine Arts

BGHS offers several art programs that follow a trimester schedule rather than the semester schedule in the rest of the school to allow instruction from different art teachers per trimester. Classes include a Prints and Metal class, a Painting/Drawing class and a Clay modeling class.  Each May, the school features the artwork of its students in an event known as "The A-May-Zing art show" and uses Bowling Green's annual Black Swamp Arts Festival to raise money as well as a Holiday art sale featuring works by local artists.

Students can participate in a well-developed performing arts department.  They can play an instrument in Band and Orchestra, sing in the choir, and participate in theater productions through the Drama Club.

The Band program currently has roughly 150 members, grades 9-12.  They spend the fall as one ensemble, Marching Band.  In November, they divide into Concert Band and Symphonic Band.  Select members may be asked to join JazzCats, the Jazz Band.  And everyone is welcome to attend Pep Band, for the Boys and Girls home basketball games.

The Orchestra is a steadily growing ensemble. They prepare music from a span of five centuries of Western classical music.  The select chamber orchestra sometimes accompanies the school's choir for formal masses.  Every spring, the senior class of the Orchestra prepares their own piece as a selection for the May Pops Concert and every four years the Orchestra travels to New York City.

Selected students from the Band and Orchestra programs may have the opportunity to participate in the Pit Orchestra for the All-School Musical in the spring.

The Choral department is busy with three ensembles; Concert Choir, which serves as a non-audition group of mostly Freshmen, Chorale, which generally contains 70-80 members, and the 16-voice ensemble of the Madrigals.  They learn music from a variety of origins and languages.  They have a minimum of four concerts a year.  Many members also participate in the All-School Musical, contributing their vocal talents.

Drama Club has roughly 140 members, from which the more select Thespians exist.  The Thespians are members of Troupe #1489 of the International Thespian Society.  The club produces at least three shows a year, including a traditional play, a musical, and usually a small production.  Members make appearances at the Northwest Ohio Regional Thespian Conference, the Ohio State Thespian Conference, and the International Thespian Festival.

College Placement
Around 80% of each graduating class begins enrollment in a two or four-year college or university after graduating.

General Academics
The school library houses about 16,000 volumes.

The High School graduation rate was 98% in 2019.

Notable Alumni 

Alexander Hanna Principal chair bass, Chicago Symphony
Matthew Kantorksi Percussionist in the Washington D.C. Navy Band, Malaysia Symphony and New York Philharmonic

Athletics
The team nickname is the Bobcats and they are members of the Northern Lakes League for most sports and the Northwest Hockey Conference for boys ice hockey.

Varsity Teams

Fall Sports

Boys
Cross-Country
Football
Golf
Soccer

Girls
Cheerleading
Cross-Country
Golf
Soccer
Tennis
Volleyball

Winter sports

Boys
Basketball
Bowling
Ice hockey
Swimming/Diving
Wrestling

Girls
Basketball
Bowling
Cheerleading
Dance Team
Swimming/Diving
Wrestling
Horse whispering

Spring Sports

Boys
Baseball
Tennis
Track & Field
Lacrosse

Girls
Softball
Track & Field

Ohio High School Athletic Association State Championships
 Boys' Ice Hockey – 1980, 1984, 1991, 1997, 1998, 1999*
 Girls Cross Country – 2003, 2004, 2005
 Competitive CheerLeading – 1971, 2015, 2016, 2017

Bowling Green lost the 1999 Ice Hockey State Championship game to St. John's Jesuit High School, however was later awarded the State Championship after St. John's Jesuit forfeited due to use of an ineligible player.  It is one of only two forfeited State Championships in OHSAA history.

Notable alumni
Scott Hamilton Ice Skating Olympic Gold Medalist 1984, World Champion 1984–1985
Andy Tracy Baseball player Colorado Rockies, New York Mets, Montreal Expos
Noah Cook Track & Field, University of Pittsburgh

Notes and references

External links
 District Website
 Bobcat Bands Website

High schools in Wood County, Ohio
Public high schools in Ohio